Sentry or The Sentry may refer to:

Comics
Sentry (Kree)
Sentry (Curtis Elkins)
Sentry (Robert Reynolds)
Senator Ward (comics) or Sentry

Vehicles
Sentry (AUV), an autonomous underwater vehicle used to measure deep-ocean data
E-3 Sentry AWACS, airborne early warning aircraft
Lancair Sentry, American kit aircraft

Other uses
Picket (military) or sentry, one or more soldiers stationed on guard duty
The Sentinel (video game), also known as The Sentry
The Sentry (organization), merger of Not on Our Watch
The Sentry (Fabritius), a 1654 painting by Carel Fabritius
"Sentry" (short story), a 1954 short story by Fredric Brown
Sentry (monitoring system), an automatic near-Earth asteroid collision monitoring system
Sentry Foods, a chain of grocery stores in Wisconsin, United States
Sentry Insurance, a Wisconsin-based insurance company
Sentry Island, Nunavut, Canada
Sentry Siren, a brand of civil defense sirens

See also
General Orders for Sentries
Nissan Sentra
Sentinel (disambiguation)
Guard (disambiguation)
SENTRI
Sentry gun, a gun that automatically aims and fires at targets
SentrySafe, a safe manufacturing company headquartered in Rochester, New York
Soviet frigate Storozhevoy
Travel Sentry